Live in Poland is a live album by American keyboardist and composer Wayne Horvitz' band Pigpen recorded in 1994 and originally released as an audio companion with the magazine "Jazz à Go-Go" but later released on the Cavity Search label.

Reception
The Allmusic review awarded the album 4 stars.

Track listing
All compositions by Wayne Horvitz except as indicated
 "Band of Joeys" - 3:34 
 "Cause I'm in Love Yeah" - 2:34 
 "Poisonhead" (John Zorn) - 1:26 
 "Sterno" - 6:58 
 "Grind" - 5:05 
 "A Portrait of Hank Williams Jr." - 6:48 
 "The Front" - 9:43 
 "Speech" - 5:24 
 "The Boss" - 5:06 
 "The Very Beginning" - 5:20 
 "Miss Ann" (Eric Dolphy) - 5:24 
 "Mr. Rogers" - 3:57 
Recorded at the Akwarium Jazz Club in Warsaw, Poland on February 3, 1994

Personnel
Wayne Horvitz - keyboards
Briggan Krauss - alto saxophone
Fred Chalenor - electric bass
Mike Stone - drums

References

Cavity Search Records albums
Wayne Horvitz albums
1994 albums